Vladimiras Beresniovas (born 13 December 1948), known under his pen name Vlaber is a Lithuanian artist, humorist, poet, and cartoonist. Vlaber has been an active participant in the Lithuanian and world artistic communities for more than 40 years. In the last 10 years, he has illustrated more than 100 books, published weekly cartoons in the local newspapers, and been named to Who's Who in Lithuania in 2008.

Biography

Beresniovas was born in Soviet Belarus in 1948. He lost his parents at a young age and at the age of 13, he found himself completely orphaned when his only remaining relative, his grandmother, died. He moved around the Soviet Union until he finally settled in Lithuanian city of Kaunas. Beresniovas learned the Lithuanian language fluently, and graduated from the Kaunas College of Art. He then submitted some of his early drawings to a local newspaper and they were published immediately.

exhibitions in 20 countries, including Greece and Bulgaria.

He is a member of the Lithuanian Artists Association, the Lithuanian Journalists Union, and the Lithuanian Cartoonists Association.

Bibliography

Published books
Linksmoteka (2008)
Geriau Ragas ant Kaktos (2002)
Vlaber Cartoons (1998)

Illustrated books

References

Websites

1948 births
Living people
Lithuanian artists
People from Mogilev Region
Lithuanian male poets
Lithuanian people of Belarusian descent
Belarusian artists
Belarusian male poets